The Hahamog'na, commonly anglicized to Hahamongna and spelled Xaxaamonga in their native language, are a tribe of the Tongva people of California. Their language belongs to the Uto-Aztecan family.

History
The Hahamogna inhabited the Verdugo Mountains foothills and San Rafael Hills; the Arroyo Seco in the westernmost San Gabriel Valley area around present day Pasadena and Altadena; and the easternmost San Fernando Valley area north of the Los Angeles River around present day Glendale; all in Los Angeles County, California. 

Two settlements named Hahamongna, California have been located. The Hahamogna band have also been called Pascual and Pascualite Indians, after which the 1843 Mexican land grant Rancho San Pascual, that included their part of the Arroyo Seco, was named.

Most correctly Hahamog'na is the name of this tribe's chief, and the tribe's name and the place in which they live also take this name. Other derivatives have been shown in an adjectival style thus referring to them as the "Hahamovic Indians."

Hahamog'na was met by Gaspar de Portolà of the overland Mexican Expedition in 1770. The Spanish began a proselytizing campaign of religious conversion and servitude, the Indian Reductions.

Upon his conversion, Hahamog-na was given the Christian name "Pascual" and his tribe became known as the Pascualite Indians, in the Indian Reductions of Mission Indians. This name preceded the naming of Rancho San Pascual, part of present-day Pasadena, San Marino, and South Pasadena. The name Hahamongna is now applied to Hahamongna Watershed Park, an archeological site of one of the Hahamongna, California settlements, a recreational area, and an open space nature preserve-park in the upper Arroyo Seco in Pasadena.

Other Tongva tribes

Other family groups of the Tongva could be found elsewhere in the San Gabriel Valley and San Fernando Valley. With the founding of Mission San Gabriel Arcángel in 1771 and Mission San Fernando Rey de España in 1797, these Tongva groups gathered at the missions and were taught European skills of farming, raising cattle and producing leather, tallow, and soap. Once converted to Christianity, the neophytes were generally not permitted to return to village life. Collectively these groups were referred to as Gabrieleños and Fernandeños by the Spanish.

Other Tongva names that are recognizable about the Southland: Cahueg-na (Cahuenga), Topag-na (Topanga), and Azuksag-na (Azusa).
Tongva populated places

See also
Tongva
Tongva language
Hahamongna, California
Arroyo Seco (Los Angeles County)
California mission clash of cultures
Spanish missions in California
Ranchos of California
List of Ranchos of California

References

Sources
Dr. Hiram Reid, Pasadena 1895, out of print (google books).
Southwest Museum, Braun Research Library, Los Angeles

Notes

External links
 official Hahamongna Watershed Park website
 Hahamongna  locator Map
Save Hahamongna.org website - ongoing open space and historic sites protection, and riparian zone restoration projects.

Tongva
Tongva populated places
Former Native American populated places in California
California Mission Indians
History of Pasadena, California
Arroyo Seco (Los Angeles County)
San Gabriel Valley
Altadena, California
History of the San Fernando Valley
People from the San Fernando Valley
People from Pasadena, California